The 1987 William & Mary Tribe football team represented the College of William & Mary as an independent during the 1987 NCAA Division I-AA football season. Led by Jimmye Laycock in his eighth year as head coach, William & Mary finished the season with a record of 5–6.

Schedule

References

William and Mary
William & Mary Tribe football seasons
William and Mary Indians football